
Year 489 BC was a year of the pre-Julian Roman calendar. At the time, it was known as the Year of the Consulship of Iullus and Rufus (or, less frequently, year 265 Ab urbe condita). The denomination 489 BC for this year has been used since the early medieval period, when the Anno Domini calendar era became the prevalent method in Europe for naming years.

Events 
 By place 

 Greece 
 After his great victory in the Battle of Marathon, Miltiades leads a naval expedition to Paros to pay off a private score. However, the expedition is unsuccessful and, on his return, he is fined in a prosecution led by Xanthippus and put in prison where he dies of wounds received at Paros.
 The Athenian soldier and statesman, Aristides (the Just), is made chief archon of Athens.

Births

Deaths 
 Cleomenes I, king of Sparta (approximate date)
 Miltiades, Athenian general (b. c. 550 BC)

References